The following is a list of 2019 box office number-one films in Japan by week. When the number-one film in gross is not the same as the number-one film in admissions, both are listed.

Highest-grossing films

See also
List of Japanese films of 2019

References

2019
Japan
2019 in Japanese cinema